Laird is an underground light rail transit (LRT) station under construction on Line 5 Eglinton, a new line that is part of the Toronto subway system. It is located in the Leaside neighbourhood in East York at the intersection of Laird Drive and Eglinton Avenue. It is scheduled to open in 2023.

This station's entrances are both on the south side of Eglinton. The main entrance is at the southwest corner of the Laird Drive intersection replacing a small strip mall and the secondary one is east of that in the Leaside Centre parking lot, just beyond the Pier 1 Imports store.

On the east side of the station, there is a third track between the eastbound and westbound tracks, either to store a train or to allow a train to change direction due to an emergency or a change in service. On the west side of the station, there is a diamond crossover.

Destinations include the many commercial establishments to the southeast: Leaside Centre, the SmartCentres on Laird, and the Leaside Business Park on Eglinton.

Ontario Premier Kathleen Wynne officiated at the ground-breaking for the station on June 30, 2016.

Construction
As of December 2021, the underground portion of the station is structurally complete and was constructed by "mining", a technique more formally called sequential excavation method (SEM). Laird,  and  stations were all constructed by this method, while the other underground Line 5 stations were built by cut-and-cover. According to Crosslinx, SEM is more common in Europe and the Crosstown is the first project to use the technique in Toronto.

Both the station platforms and the adjacent switching track assemblies are contained within a single circular tube, and there are no support columns between the tracks.

At Laird, two shafts were built on the south side of Eglinton Avenue on both the east and west sides of Laird Drive. From the vertical shafts, workers mined horizontally towards and above the twin tunnels created by the tunnel boring machines. Large pipe-like sections are used to support the roof of the excavation. Then, workers gradually excavated down to the liners of the twin tunnels, which were removed. When the excavation was finished, there was a multi-storey cavern with an arched ceiling, which provides enough strength to support the ground above. The tunnel walls were sprayed with shotcrete, a special concrete that cures in ten minutes. Excavation was done slowly, about 1.5 metres per day; mining work proceeded on a 24-hour, 7-day-a-week basis using two crews of ten workers each.

Surface connections 

, the following are the proposed connecting routes that would serve this station when Line 5 Eglinton opens:

References

External links
Laird Station project page at the Eglinton Crosstown website
; published by the Toronto Star on April 27, 2018
; published by the Crosstown project on June 7, 2018

Line 5 Eglinton stations